Alan Robertovich Khugayev (born 31 August 1991) is a Russian football player who plays for FC Ufa.

Club career
He made his debut in the Russian Football National League for FC Alania Vladikavkaz on 1 August 2020 in a game against FC SKA-Khabarovsk, as a starter.

International career
He represented Abkhazia national football team in several CONIFA competitions.

References

External links
 
 Profile by Russian Football National League
 

1991 births
Sportspeople from Vladikavkaz
Living people
Russian footballers
Association football midfielders
FC Dynamo Stavropol players
FC Spartak Vladikavkaz players
FC Mashuk-KMV Pyatigorsk players
FC Ufa players
Russian First League players
Russian Second League players